The 1968 Notre Dame Fighting Irish football team represented the University of Notre Dame during the 1968 NCAA University Division football season. They were led by fifth-year head coach Ara Parseghian and competed as an independent. The Irish finished with a final record of 7–2–1.  In their final game of the season, they played No. 2 USC to a 21–21 tie.

Schedule

Roster

Game summaries

Oklahoma

Purdue

Iowa

Northwestern

Illinois

Michigan State

Navy

Pittsburgh

Georgia Tech

Southern Cal

References

Notre Dame
Notre Dame Fighting Irish football seasons
Notre Dame Fighting Irish football